Thomas Cuttyng (died 1412 or after), of Wilton, Wiltshire, was an English Member of Parliament.

He was a Member (MP) of the Parliament of England for Wilton in January 1377, February 1383, February 1388, January 1390, 1394, 1395 and 1399.

The last recorded mention of him was in 1412; his date of death is unknown.

References

14th-century births
15th-century deaths
English MPs January 1377
People from Wilton, Wiltshire
English MPs February 1383
English MPs February 1388
English MPs January 1390
English MPs 1394
English MPs 1395
English MPs 1399